Chasiv Yar is a city in Bakhmut Raion, Donetsk Oblast (province) of Ukraine. In January 2022, it had a population of 12,250.

History 
In 1938, the urban-type settlement became a city.

During the Second World War, from October 1941 to September 1943, the city was occupied by Axis troops.

Later, the restoration of the city began. In 1957, there were an enterprise for the extraction of refractory clay, an enterprise for the production of refractory materials, four secondary schools, two seven-year schools, a FZO school, two Palaces of Culture, 14 libraries, four clubs and two stadiums.

In January 1989, the population was 19,804 people, the basis of the economy was the extraction of refractory clays and the production of refractory products.

In January 2013 the population was 13,999 people.

Invasion of Ukraine (2022–2023) 

On 9 July 2022, Russian rocket strikes on the city destroyed a railway station and partially ruined a residential building. That same day, a missile strike on a residential area killed at least 48 people.

Following the loss of Soledar on January 16, 2023 and the fall of Klishchiivka on January 20, Chasiv Yar has become a pivotal center for Ukrainian defenses on the Donetsk front as it is the only route for Ukrainian troops and supplies into and out of the besieged city of Bakhmut.

On March 14, 2023 two projectiles with white phosphorus munitions were fired on a road at the southern edge of Chasiv Yar.

Economy 
Chasiv Yar's economy is built around the mining of refractory clays and production of refractory products. The  is located in the settlement.

Transport 
There was one railway station in Chasiv Yar, destroyed on July 9, 2022 during the 2022 Russian invasion of Ukraine.

Demographics

Native language as of the Ukrainian Census of 2001:
Ukrainian  52.4%
Russian  46.6%
Armenian  0.2%
Romani  0.1%
Belarusian 0.1%
Moldovan  0.1%

Notable people

 Joseph Kobzon (1937–2018), an iconic Soviet crooner who has been acclaimed as "the official voice of the Soviet Union", was born on September 11, 1937 in Chasiv Yar.
  (1934–2016), writer and local historian
 Anatoly Ivanovich Shamshur (1924–1943), Red Army sergeant and Hero of the Soviet Union

References

Cities in Donetsk Oblast
Bakhmut Raion
Populated places established in the Russian Empire